Janine Lindemulder is an American nude model, former exotic dancer and retired pornographic actress. She is best known for her work in American pornographic films (typically credited mononymously as Janine) during the mid-1990s and since a 2004 comeback. Lindemulder is a member of the AVN Hall of Fame and the XRCO Hall of Fame, and she has appeared in several music videos for various bands, including Blink-182, as well as appearing on the cover of Blink-182's 1999 album Enema of the State.

Early career
After graduating from high school in 1986, Lindemulder worked as a stripper. She answered an ad looking for a figure model, not knowing "figure model" meant nude model. After meeting with the photographer who posted the ad, he asked her to do a spread for Penthouse, a men's magazine. Lindemulder made her first appearance in the December 1987 issue, as the Pet of the Month. She appeared several more times in Penthouse over the next ten years as well as other men's magazines such as Gallery and Hustler, and was chosen as Pet of the Year Runner-Up for 1990.

Lindemulder's first cinematic role came in the 1988 Italian film Bersaglio sull'autostrada, known as Moving Target in English-speaking countries. She was credited as Janine Linde. She went on to act in other lower-tier mainstream films, including Spring Break USA and Caged Fury.

Career

Adult film career
Lindemulder made her adult film debut in the 1992 feature Andrew Blake's Hidden Obsessions. She was featured in two more adult movies before joining Vivid Video as an exclusive "contract girl" (who are collectively referred to as the Vivid Girls). Her first Vivid release was titled Parlor Games. Lindemulder subsequently appeared featured in over fifty other Vivid titles. Together with fellow adult film performer Julia Ann, Lindemulder also formed the exotic dancing duo Blondage who headlined several videos for Vivid. Blondage was featured in an early issue of the Carnal Comics comic book title True Stories of Adult Film Stars, which included a story written by Lindemulder.

Modeling and acting
In 1997, Lindemulder played the wife of a camp director in the Howard Stern film Private Parts. She also appeared on Stern's television and radio shows as a featured guest. Lindemulder was the cover model for Blink-182's 1999 album Enema of the State, and appeared in their video for the song "What's My Age Again?" as a nurse.

Retirement and comeback
In 1999, Lindemulder announced that she was leaving the adult film industry to pursue a career as a kindergarten teacher. She added that another reason she was retiring was to focus more on raising her son. She was inducted into the AVN Hall of Fame in 2002, and her retirement lasted until April 2004, when she announced that she would be making a comeback – now, for the first time, performing with men. She signed with her former company, Vivid Video, and starred in eight new films. Her first film scene with a male was with Nick Manning in Maneater. After her comeback deal with Vivid expired, Lindemulder signed with Vivid rival Digital Playground and starred in a handful of features for them, including Pirates in 2005.

In January 2006 she won two AVN Awards. Her April 2007 film Janine Loves Jenna co-stars Jenna Jameson.

Lindemulder appeared in front of a camera for the first time in five years in the 2017 documentary After Porn Ends 2, covering her rise to fame, her Blondage act, her mental unpreparedness for the realities of being famous and the post-effects of her custody battle for her daughter with Jesse James.

Lindemulder has an OnlyFans account, which she started in 2017.

Personal life
Lindemulder was married to West Coast Choppers founder Jesse James from 2002 until 2004.

Legal issues and custody battle
In August 2008, Lindemulder pleaded guilty to federal misdemeanor charges of willful failure to pay federal income taxes. She had failed to pay nearly $300,000 in back taxes. She had made a down payment on a $647,000 house and bought two new vehicles – despite being aware of her tax debt obligations. She faced up to one year in prison, and a $100,000 fine.

In December 2008, Lindemulder began serving a six-month federal prison sentence for tax evasion. The judge also ordered that she live in a residential community corrections center for up to six months after her release from prison, that she complete one year of supervised release, and that she repay the federal government $294,000 in back taxes.

During Lindemulder's incarceration, Jesse James was awarded custody of their daughter. Upon Lindemulder's release, James and Lindemulder engaged in a custody battle over their daughter- which went on until 2012. Lindemulder had weekly visitation rights limited to daytime hours. Her request for expanded visitation rights was denied by an Orange County family court.

Awards
 1994 XRCO Award - Best Girl-Girl Scene (Hidden Obsessions) with Julia Ann
 1994 AVN Award - Best All-Girl Sex Scene, Film (Hidden Obsessions) with Julia Ann
 1997 AVN Award - Best Tease Performance (Extreme Close-Up)
 2000 AVN Award - Best All-Girl Sex Scene, Film (Seven Deadly Sins) with Julia Ann
 2000 AVN Award - Best Supporting Actress, Film (Seven Deadly Sins)
 2002 AVN Hall of Fame inductee
 2006 AVN Award - Best All-Girl Sex Scene (Pirates) with Jesse Jane
 2006 AVN Award - Best Actress, Video (Pirates)
 2006 XRCO Award - MILF of the Year
 2006 XRCO Hall of Fame inductee
 2007 AVN Award - Best Sex Scene Coupling, Film (Emperor) with Manuel Ferrara

References

External links

RogReviews.com Interview
Podcast Interview at Odeo

Alt porn
American female adult models
American pornographic film actresses
American people convicted of tax crimes
American prisoners and detainees
Living people
Penthouse Pets
People from Greater Los Angeles
Pornographic film actors from California
Prisoners and detainees of the United States federal government
21st-century American women
OnlyFans creators
Year of birth missing (living people)